Georgiana is a Catalan, English, Greek and Romanian name.  It is the feminine form of the male name George and a variation of the female names Georgina and Georgia.  It comes from the Greek word Γεώργιος, meaning farmer. A variant spelling is Georgianna.

List of persons with the given name Georgiana
Georgiana Buller (1884–1953), English hospital administrator 
Georgiana Birțoiu (born 1989), Romanian footballer
Georgiana Burne-Jones (1840–1920), artist, wife and biographer of Edward Burne-Jones
Georgiana Cavendish, Duchess of Devonshire (1757–1806)
Georgiana Drew (1856–1893), American actress and comedian, a member of the Barrymore acting family
Georgiana Fullerton (1812–1885), English novelist, philanthropist, and biographer
Georgiana Harcourt (1807–1886), writer and translator
Georgiana Hill (1858-1924), British social historian and women's rights activist
Georgiana Goddard King (1871–1939), American Hispanist and medievalist
Georgiana McCrae (1804–1890), English-Australian painter and diarist
Georgiana Molloy (1805–1843), English-Australian botanical collector
Georgiana Rolls, Baroness Llangattock (c.1837–1923), socialite and enthusiast for Nelson

Fictional characters 
Georgiana Darcy, younger sister of one of the main characters in Pride and Prejudice
 Georgiana Pirrip, the mother of Pip in Charles Dickens‘s "Great Expectations"
 Georgiana, wife of Aylmer in Nathaniel Hawthorne's "The Birthmark"
 Georgiana Reed, cousin of Jane Eyre in Charlotte Brontë's novel of the same name.

Dramatic works 

Georgiana (2019), an opera pasticcio based on the life of Georgiana Cavendish, Duchess of Devonshire (1757–1806) commissioned by the Buxton Festival.

Territories 

Georgiana, a colony proposed by Phineas Lyman for establishment in the Natchez district of British West Florida.

List of persons with the given name Georgianna 

 Georgianna Bell, a pen name of the author Anne Rundle
 Georgianna Bishop (1878–1971), American golfer
 Georgianna Hiliadaki, Greek chef
 Georgianna Hopley (1858–1944), better known as Georgia Hopley, American journalist and temperance advocate
 Georgianna Lincoln (born 1943), American politician and businesswoman
 Georgianna Robertson (born 1972), Jamaican model and actress
 Georgianna Stout (born 1967), American graphic designer
 Georgianna Kathleen Symonette (1902–1965), Bahamian suffragist

References

English given names
Greek feminine given names
English feminine given names
Romanian feminine given names
Catalan feminine given names